Michaelsberg may refer to:

Mountains in Baden-Württemberg, Germany
 Michaelsberg (Cleebronn)
 Michaelsberg (Gundelsheim)
 Michaelsberg (Untergrombach)

Religious buildings
 Michaelsberg Abbey, Bamberg, Bavaria
 Michaelsberg Abbey, Siegburg, North Rhine-Westphalia

See also
 Michelsberg (disambiguation)